Nalayak is a 1978 Hindi-language action film, produced by Jagdish C. Sharma on Veena Films banner and directed by Padmanabh. Starring Jeetendra, Leena Chandavarkar and music composed by Kalyanji Anandji.

Plot
Laxman is a slacker and an unbeaten, expert gambler. He is a pampered brother of Ram Narayan and his wife Sita whom he idolizes. Anyway, Ram Narayan is annoyed by the lifestyle of Laxman and considers him the black sheep of the family. During his daily grind of gaming, Laxman meets Rita and falls for her younger sister Seema. Meanwhile, Ram Narayan holds a jewelry store, Rita asks for a charm which turns fake after delivery. Here, Ram Narayan, assures to settle the matter which follows the death of Rita, therefore, Ram Narayan is accused and sentenced. Right now, Laxman pledges to acquit his brother by jeopardizing his life. After several mysterious twists which reveals the guilty party to be Prem, a friend of Ram Narayan. At last, Laxman seizes him and safeguards his family. The movie ends with the marriage of Laxman and Seema.

Cast

Jeetendra as Laxman Narayan
Leena Chandavarkar as Seema
Asrani as Lallu Kumar Lalla
Satyendra Kapoor as Ram Narayan
Murad as Police Commissioner
Sujit Kumar as Prem
Raza Murad as Inspector Ramesh
Dara Singh as Pahelwan
Nirupa Roy as Sita Narayan
Bindu as Rita
Shivraj as Mala's father
Manju Asrani as Leelu
Master Raju as Raju
Moolchand as Moolchandani as Customer in Casino bar
Gurbachan Singh as Goon in Casino Bar

Soundtrack

References

External links
 

1978 films
1970s Hindi-language films
Indian action drama films
Films scored by Kalyanji Anandji